Guntis Belēvičs (born September 2, 1958) is a Latvian politician, who was Minister of Health in the second Straujuma and Kučinskis cabinets from 2014 to 2016.

References

1958 births
Living people
People from Ape Municipality
Riga State Gymnasium No.1 alumni
Latvian Green Party politicians
Ministers of Health of Latvia
Deputies of the 12th Saeima
Latvian physicians